Dorset House was a large house in Headington, Oxford, England.

This villa, known in its later years as Dorset House, was built in 1878 on the south side of London Road, Oxford. It had several names during its lifetime:

 1878–1899: Ellerslie
 1899–1920: Hillstow
 1920–1961: Hillstow Annexe, Headington School
 1961–2004: Dorset House, School of Occupational Therapy

Catherine Caughey (1923–2008), who worked on codebreaking at Bletchley Park during World War II, subsequently trained as an occupational therapist at Dorset House.

The house was acquired by Quintain property developers in 2006 and demolished in 2009. Quintain sold the site to Berkeley Homes in September 2010 for £5m. The site was developed as student housing for Oxford Brookes University students during 2011–12. and is managed by Unite, still under the name of Dorset House.

References

1878 establishments in England
2009 disestablishments in England
Houses completed in 1878
Buildings and structures demolished in 2009
Occupational therapy organizations
Former buildings and structures in Oxford
Houses in Oxfordshire
Demolished buildings and structures in England
Defunct schools in Oxfordshire
Oxford Brookes University
Halls of residence in the United Kingdom
Buildings and structures in Oxford
History of Oxford